Fareb may refer to:
Fareb (1953 film)
Fareb (1968 film)
Fareb (1983 film)
Fareb (1996 film), a 1996 Bollywood thriller film
Fareb (1997 film)
Fareb (2005 film), a 2005 Indian romantic thriller film